Tong Liya (born 8 August 1983) is a Chinese actress of Xibe ethnicity.

Background
Tong was born in Qapqal Xibe Autonomous County, Ili Kazakh Autonomous Prefecture, Xinjiang province. Her father Tong Jisheng was of Xibe ethnicity from Xinjiang while her mother Mao Haiying was of Han ethnicity from Gansu.

Tong majored in dance at the Xinjiang Arts Institute, and due to her excellent results, was able to gain a placement at the Xinjiang Singing & Dancing Troupe. She subsequently obtained a qualification to teach dance at Xinjiang Arts Institute in 2000. In 2004, she enrolled in Central Academy of Drama, majoring in performance.

Tong was named Ambassador of Xibe in 2011.

Career
Tong made her debut in the Hong Kong television series C'est La Vie, Mon Chéri in 2008, and gained attention for her beautiful looks. Following her role as Zhao Feiyan in the 2009 historical drama The Queens, Tong experienced a rise in popularity.

Tong successfully broke into the mainstream with her subsequent roles in Palace (2011) and Beijing Love Story (2012), which were both major hits. Throughout her career, Tong has portrayed various roles in hit dramas My Economical Man (2012), Weaning (2013), Sword Family Woman (2014) and Obstetrician (2014); and was named the "Ratings Queen" by the Chinese media. She also starred in films, most notably Tsui Hark's wuxia film The Taking of Tiger Mountain (2014) and Chen Sicheng's comedy film Detective Chinatown (2015).

In 2015, Tong starred in the period drama Ordinary World (2015), based on the Mao Dun Literature Prize novel of the same name by Lu Yao. She received acclaim for her performance, and won the Golden Eagle Award for Best Actress.

In 2017, Tong starred in the wuxia drama Nirvana in Fire 2, the sequel to the critically acclaimed drama Nirvana in Fire by Hai Yan.

In 2018, Tong starred in two spy dramas. In Great Expectations, she played the role of a wealthy lady who disguises as a man to infiltrate the underworld to seek revenge for her dead father. In Patriot, she played the role of an underground spy. Tong won the Audience's Loved Character award at the China TV Drama Awards for her portrayal. The same year, Tong won acclaim and numerous accolades for her performance in the romance comedy film How Long Will I Love U.

In January 2020, she starred in the workplace drama Perfect Partner as a public relations officer.

Personal life
Tong and actor Chen Sicheng got married on 16 January 2014. The couple met and fell in love while filming the television series Beijing Love Story, which Chen directed and co-scripted. They announced their relationship on the set of Happy Camp in 2012. The couple got married in 2014 at Tahiti.

On 30 January 2016, Tong announced that she had given birth to their first child, a son named Chen Duoduo. On 20 May 2021, Tong and Chen announced their divorce.

Filmography

Film

Television series

Discography

Singles

Awards and nominations

Forbes China Celebrity 100

References

External links 
 Tong Liya
 

1984 births
Living people
Central Academy of Drama alumni
People from Ili
Actresses from Xinjiang
Chinese film actresses
Chinese television actresses
Chinese stage actresses
21st-century Chinese actresses
Sibe people